Ian Harvey is an Australian cricketer.

Ian Harvey or Ian Harvie may also refer to:

 Ian Harvey (politician) (1914–1987), British businessman and politician
 Ian Harvey (rugby union) (1903–1966), New Zealand rugby union player
 Ian Harvie, American comedian
 Iain Harvie, musician